Astorga is a Hispanic surname that may refer to the following notable people:
André Astorga (born 1980), Brazilian football defender
Ángelo Astorga (born 1993), Chilean football player
Baltazar Astorga (born 1982), Chilean football player
Christina Astorga, American theologian
Emanuele d'Astorga (1681–1736) Italian composer
Emiliano Astorga (born 1960), Chilean football player
Herminio A. Astorga (1929–2004), the vice-mayor of the City of Manila from 1962 to 1967
Juan Oliver y Astorga (1733–1830), Spanish composer
Manuel Astorga (born 1937), Chilean football goalkeeper
Mónica Astorga Cremona (born 1967), Argentine nun
Nora Astorga (1948–1988), Nicaraguan guerrilla fighter
Pedro d'Alva y Astorga, Spanish Catholic theologian

Spanish-language surnames